Epichoristodes is a genus of moths in the family Tortricidae and the tribe Archipini. The genus was erected by Alexey Diakonoff in 1960.

Species

Epichoristodes acerbella (Walker, 1864)
Epichoristodes adustana (Walsingham, 1881)
Epichoristodes apilectica Diakonoff, 1960
Epichoristodes atricaput Diakonoff, 1973
Epichoristodes atycta Bradley, 1965
Epichoristodes canonicum Diakonoff, 1973
Epichoristodes cinerata (Meyrick, 1920)
Epichoristodes dorsiplagana (Walsingham, 1881)
Epichoristodes exanimata (Meyrick, 1920)
Epichoristodes goniopa Diakonoff, 1960
Epichoristodes heterotropha Bradley, 1965
Epichoristodes imbriculata (Meyrick, 1938)
Epichoristodes incerta Diakonoff, 1960
Epichoristodes leucocymba (Meyrick, 1912)
Epichoristodes licmaea Meyrick, 1920
Epichoristodes macrosema Diakonoff, 1970
Epichoristodes niphosema (Meyrick, 1917)
Epichoristodes panochra Bradley, 1965
Epichoristodes phalaraea (Meyrick, 1920)
Epichoristodes pylora (Meyrick, 1938)
Epichoristodes spinulosa Meyrick, 1924
Epichoristodes ypsilon Diakonoff, 1960

Former species
Epichoristodes psoricodes (Meyrick, 1911)

See also
List of Tortricidae genera

References

 Brown, J. W. (2005). World Catalogue of Insects. 5 Tortricidae.
 Diakonoff, A. (1960). Verhandelingen der Koninklijke Nederlandse Akademie van Wetenschappen. (2) 53 (2): 166.
 Razowski, J.; Aarvik, L. & de Prins, J. (2010). "An annotated catalogue of the types of Tortricidae (Lepidoptera) in the collection of the Royal Museum for Central Africa (Tervuren, Belgium) with descriptions of new genera and new species". Zootaxa. 2469: 1-77.
 Razowski, J. & Krüger, M. (2013). "An illustrated catalogue of the specimens of Tortricidae in the Iziko South African Museum, Cape Town (Lepidoptera: Tortricidae)". SHILAP Revista de Lepidopterología. 41 (162): 213–240.

External links
 Tortricid.net

Archipini
Tortricidae genera
Taxa named by Alexey Diakonoff